European Curling Federation (ECF) governs organized curling in Europe. It was formed in 1975, and hosts the European Curling Championships.

Office bearers of the European Curling Federation

Presidents
1975–1977: Jean Schild, Switzerland
1977–1979: Bob Grierson, Scotland
1979–1983: Birger Mortensen, Norway
1983–1988: Eric Harmsen, Netherlands
1988–1992: Sten Willer-Andersen, Denmark
1992–2000: Roy Sinclair, Scotland
2000–2008: Malcolm Richardson, Scotland
2008–2011: Andrew Ferguson Smith, Andorra
2011–    : Olli Rissanen, Finland

Vice presidents
2000–2006: Dieter Kolb, Germany
2006– Andrew Ferguson Smith, Andorra

Secretaries
1975–1977: André Viscolo, Switzerland
1977–1980: Robin Welsh, Scotland
1980–1983: Stanley Flostrand, Norway
1983–1996: Annemie de Jongh, Netherlands
1996–2000: Marc Lüthi, Switzerland
2000– Saskia Krügl, Austria

External links
 European Curling Federation 

Curling governing bodies
European sports federations
Sports organizations established in 1975